Quebec City is the second largest city in Quebec with a growing population of 531,902. Quebec City's three tallest buildings are the tallest in Canada east of Montreal.

Most of the city's skyscrapers, including the tallest, were built between the late 1960s and early 1980s.

Château Frontenac was the tallest building in the province of Quebec from the completion of its tallest tower in 1924 to the completion of Montreal's Royal Bank Tower in 1928. However, following the approval of the construction of the Le Phare de Québec complex in 2019, Quebec City is set to retake the title of hosting Quebec's tallest building by 2022.

Tallest buildings
This list ranks buildings in Quebec City that stand at least 60 m (197 ft) tall, based on CTBUH height measurement standards. This includes spires and architectural details but does not include antenna masts. An equal sign (=) following a rank indicates the same height between two or more buildings.

Tallest buildings under construction
This includes spires and architectural details but does not include antenna masts.

Other important buildings

Quebec Parliament Building

The Parliament Building (French: Hôtel du Parlement) is an eight-floor building and home to the Parliament of Quebec (composed of the Lieutenant-Governor and the National Assembly) in Quebec City. The building was designed by architect Eugène-Étienne Taché and was built from 1877 to 1886. With the frontal tower, the building stands at 52 metres or 171 feet in height.

It features the Second Empire architectural style that was popular for prestigious buildings both in Europe (especially France where the style originated) and the United States during the latter 19th century. Although somewhat more sober in appearance and lacking a towering central belfry, Quebec City's Parliament Building bears a definite likeness to the Philadelphia City Hall, another Second Empire edifice in North America which was built during the same period. Even though the building's symmetrical layout with a frontal clock tower in the middle is typical of legislative institutions of British heritage, the architectural style is believed to be unique among parliament buildings found in other Canadian provincial capitals. Its facade presents a pantheon representing significant events and people of the history of Quebec.

Palace Station

Gare du Palais (‘Palace Station’) is a train and bus station in Quebec City. Its name comes from its proximity to the Palace of the Intendant of New France. It is served by Via Rail, Canada’s national passenger railway, and by the private coach company Orléans Express.

Built in 1915 by the Canadian Pacific Railway, the two-storey châteauesque station is similar in design to the Château Frontenac. The station had no passenger rail service from 1976 to 1985, although it once again hosts regular daily services west to Montreal's Central Station via Drummondville. It was designated a Heritage Railway Station in 1992.

Timeline of tallest buildings

See also

 List of tallest buildings in Quebec

References

External links
 Quebec City High-Rise Buildings

 
Quebec City
Tallest buildings in Quebec City